Jeopardy! is an American game show created by Merv Griffin. The show is a quiz competition that reverses the traditional question-and-answer format of many quiz shows. Rather than being given questions, contestants are instead given general knowledge clues in the form of answers and they must identify the person, place, thing, or idea that the clue describes, phrasing each response in the form of a question. 

The original daytime version debuted on NBC on March 30, 1964, and aired until January 3, 1975. A nighttime syndicated edition aired weekly from September 1974 to September 1975, and a revival, The All-New Jeopardy!, ran on NBC from October 1978 to March 1979 on weekdays. The syndicated show familiar with modern viewers and produced daily (currently by Sony Pictures Television) premiered on September 10, 1984.

Art Fleming served as host for all versions of the show between 1964 and 1979. Don Pardo served as announcer until 1975, and John Harlan announced for the 1978–1979 season. The daily syndicated version premiered in 1984 with Alex Trebek as host and Johnny Gilbert as announcer. Trebek hosted until his death, with his last episode airing January 8, 2021, after over 35 years in the role. Following his death, a variety of guest hosts completed the season beginning with consulting producer and former contestant Ken Jennings, each hosting for a few weeks before passing the role onto someone else. Since September 2021, after then-executive producer Mike Richards assumed, then relinquished within a week, the position of permanent host, Jennings and Mayim Bialik have served as permanent rotating hosts of the syndicated series. While Bialik was originally arranged to host additional primetime specials on ABC, and spin-offs, the announcement of Jeopardy! Masters in 2023 meant these duties were shared as well.

Currently in its 39th season, Jeopardy! is one of the longest-running game shows of all time. The show has consistently enjoyed a wide viewership and received many accolades from professional television critics. With over 8,000 episodes aired, the daily syndicated version of Jeopardy! has won a record 39 Daytime Emmy Awards as well as a Peabody Award. In 2013, the program was ranked No. 45 on TV Guides list of the 60 greatest shows in American television history. Jeopardy! has also gained a worldwide following with regional adaptations in many other countries.

Gameplay
Each game of Jeopardy! features three contestants competing in three rounds: the Jeopardy! round, the Double Jeopardy! round, and the Final Jeopardy! round. In each round, contestants are presented trivia clues phrased as answers, to which they must respond in the form of a question that correctly identifies whatever the clue is describing. For example, if a contestant were to select "Presidents for $200", the resulting clue could be "This 'Father of Our Country' didn't really chop down a cherry tree", to which the correct response is "Who is/was George Washington?"

The Jeopardy! and Double Jeopardy! rounds each feature large electronic game boards consisting of six categories with five clues each. The clues are valued by dollar amounts from lowest to highest, ostensibly by difficulty. The values of the clues increased over time, with those in the Double Jeopardy! round always being double the range of the Jeopardy! round. On the original Jeopardy! series, clue values in the first round ranged from $10 to $50 in the Jeopardy! round and $20 to $100 in Double Jeopardy! On The All-New Jeopardy!, they ranged from $25 to $125 and $50 to $250. The 1984 series' first round originally ranged from $100 to $500 in Jeopardy! and $200 to $1,000 in Double Jeopardy! These ranges were increased to $200–$1,000 and $400–$2,000, respectively, on November 26, 2001.

Gameplay begins when the returning champion (or in Tournament of Champions play, the highest seeded player, or in all tournaments' second or final round play, the player with the highest score in the previous round) selects a clue by indicating its category and dollar value on the game board. The two (or if there is no returning champion, three) challengers, or in non-Tournament of Champions play, first round tournament contestants, participate in a random draw prior to taping to determine contestant order, and if there is no returning champion or in first round play of regular tournaments, the contestant who drew the first lectern starts first. The underlying clue is revealed and read aloud by the host, after which any contestant may ring in using a lock-out device. The first contestant to ring in successfully is prompted to respond to the clue by stating a question containing the correct answer to the clue. Any grammatically coherent question with the correct answer within it counts as a correct response. If the contestant responds correctly, its dollar value is added to the contestant's score, and they may select a new clue from the board. An incorrect response or a failure to respond within five seconds deducts the clue's value from the contestant's score and allows the other contestants the opportunity to ring in and respond. If the response is not technically incorrect but otherwise judged too vague to be correct, the contestant is given additional time to provide a more specific response. Whenever none of the contestants ring in and respond correctly, the host gives the correct response, and the player who selected the previous clue chooses the next clue. Gameplay continues until the board is cleared or the round's time length expires, which is typically indicated by a beeping sound. The contestant who has the lowest score selects the first clue to start the Double Jeopardy! round. If there is a tie for the contestant with the lowest score, the contestant with the last correct question among the tied players will select first in the round, a rule change since season 38 (2021) and made public on an August 2022 show podcast.

A "Daily Double" clue is hidden behind one clue in the Jeopardy! round, and two in Double Jeopardy! The name and inspiration were taken from a horse-racing term. Daily Double clues with a sound component are known as "Audio Daily Doubles", and clues with a video component are known as "Video Daily Doubles". Before the clue is revealed, the contestant who has selected the Daily Double must declare a wager, from a minimum of $5 to a maximum of their entire score (known as a "true Daily Double") or the highest clue value available in the round, whichever is greater. Only the contestant who chooses the Daily Double is allowed to answer the clue and they must provide a response. A correct response adds the value of the wager to the contestant's score while an incorrect response (or failure to provide any response at all) deducts the same value. Whether or not the contestant responds correctly, they choose the next clue.

During the Jeopardy! round, contestants are not penalized for forgetting to phrase their response in the form of a question, although the host will remind them to watch their phrasing in future responses if they do. In the Double Jeopardy! round and in the Daily Double in the Jeopardy! round, the phrasing rule is followed more strictly, with a response only able to be ruled as correct if it is phrased properly in question form. A contestant who initially does not phrase a response in the form of a question must re-phrase it before the host rules against them. 

Contestants are encouraged to select the clues in order from lowest to highest value, as the clues are sometimes written in each category to flow from one to the next, as is the case with game shows that ask questions in a linear string. Deviating from this is known as the "Forrest Bounce", a strategy in which contestants randomly pick clues to confuse opponents that was first used in 1985 by Chuck Forrest, who won over $70,000 in his initial run as champion. Trebek expressed that this strategy not only annoyed him but the staffers as well since it also disrupts the rhythm that develops when revealing the clues and increases the potential for error. Another strategy used by some contestants is to play all of the higher-valued clues first and build up a substantial lead, starting at the bottom of the board. James Holzhauer, whose April–June 2019 winning streak included the ten highest single-day game totals, regularly used this strategy, in conjunction with the Forrest Bounce and aggressive Daily Double wagering.

From the premiere of the original Jeopardy! until the end of the 1984–85 syndicated season, contestants were allowed to ring in as soon as the clue was revealed. Since September 1985, contestants have been required to wait until the clue is read before ringing in. To accommodate the rule change, lights were added to the game board (unseen by home viewers) to signify when it is permissible for contestants to signal. Attempting to signal before the light goes on locks the contestant out for half of a second. The change was made to allow the home audience to play along more easily and to keep an extremely fast contestant from potentially dominating the game. In pre-1985 episodes, a sound accompanied a contestant ringing in. According to Trebek, the sound was eliminated because it was "distracting to the viewers" and presented a problem when contestants rang in while Trebek was still reading the clue. Contestants who are visually impaired or blind have been given a card with the category names printed in Braille before each round begins.

To ensure fairness in competition and accuracy in scores, the judges double-check their own rulings throughout the production of each episode. If it is determined at any point that a previous response was wrongly ruled correct or incorrect during the taping of an episode, the scores are adjusted at the first available opportunity, almost always either at the start of the round or right before a Daily Double clue is revealed, with the host providing any necessary explanation regarding the changes. If an error that may have affected the result is not discovered until after taping of an episode is completed, the affected contestant(s) are invited back to compete on a future show, complying with federal quiz show regulations. However, this is rare, as most errors are found in the course of an episode's taping itself.

Contestants who finish Double Jeopardy! with $0 or a negative score are automatically eliminated from the game at that point and awarded a consolation prize. On at least one episode hosted by Art Fleming, all three contestants finished Double Jeopardy! with $0 or less, and as a result, no Final Jeopardy! round was played. This rule is still in place for the syndicated version, although staff has suggested that it is not set in stone and they may decide to display the clue for home viewers' play if such a situation were ever to occur.

Final Jeopardy!
The Final Jeopardy! round features a single clue. At the end of the Double Jeopardy! round, the host announces the Final Jeopardy! category and a commercial break follows. Contestants who finish Double Jeopardy! with less than $1 do not participate in this round. During the break, partitions are placed between the contestant lecterns, and each contestant makes a final wager; they may wager any amount of their earnings, but may not wager certain numbers with connotations that are deemed inappropriate. Contestants write their wagers using a light pen on an electronic display on their lectern, and are limited to five minutes (although the limit may be adjusted if production issues delay the resumption of taping). During this time, contestants also phrase the question, which is pre-written during the wager.  After the break, the Final Jeopardy! clue is revealed and read by the host. The contestants have 30 seconds to write their responses on the electronic display, while the show's "Think!" music plays. If either the display or the pen malfunctions, contestants can manually write their responses and wagers using an index card and marker, although the index card has the required phrasing pre-printed on each side ("Who/What"). Visually impaired or blind contestants typically type their responses and wagers with a computer keyboard.

Contestants' responses are revealed in order of their pre-Final Jeopardy! scores from lowest to highest. Once a correct response is revealed the host confirms it. Otherwise, the host reveals the correct response if all contestants responded incorrectly. A correct response adds the amount of the contestant's wager to their score. A miss, failure to respond, insufficiently specific response, misspelling that affects the pronunciation of the answer, or failure to phrase the response as a question (even if correct) deducts it.

The contestant with the highest score at the end of the round is that day's winner. If there is a tie for second place, consolation prizes are awarded based on the scores going into the Final Jeopardy! round. If all three contestants finish with $0, no one returns as champion for the next show, and based on scores going into the Final Jeopardy! round, the two contestants who were first and second receive the second-place prize, and the contestant in third receives the third-place prize.

Various researchers have studied Final Jeopardy! wagering strategies. If the leader's score is more than twice the second place contestant's score (a situation known as a "runaway game"), the leader can guarantee victory by making a sufficiently small wager. Otherwise, according to Jeopardy! College Champion Keith Williams, the leader usually wagers an amount that would be a dollar greater than twice the second place contestant's score, guaranteeing a win with a correct response. Writing about Jeopardy! wagering in the 1990s, Gilbert and Hatcher said that "most players wager aggressively.”

Winnings
The top scorer in each game is paid their winnings in cash and returns to play in the next match. Non-winners receive consolation prizes instead of their winnings in the game. As of May 16, 2002, consolation prizes have been $2,000 for the second-place contestant(s) and $1,000 for the third-place contestant. Since travel and lodging are generally not provided for contestants, cash consolation prizes offset these costs. Production covers the cost of travel for returning champions and players invited back because of errors who must make multiple trips to Los Angeles. Production also covers the cost of travel if a tournament travels (does not stay in Los Angeles) on the second week.

During Art Fleming's hosting run, all three contestants received their winnings in cash where applicable. This was changed at the start of Trebek's hosting run to avoid the problem of contestants who stopped participating in the game, or avoided wagering in Final Jeopardy!, rather than risk losing the money they had already won. This also allowed the increase to clue values since only one contestant's score is paid instead of three. From 1984 to 2002, non-winning contestants on the Trebek version received vacation packages and merchandise, which were donated by manufacturers as promotional consideration. Since 2004, a presenting sponsor has provided cash prizes to the losing contestants. From 2017 to 2021, GEICO served as the presenting sponsor of the consolation prizes, except for the Tournaments, which were sponsored by Consumer Cellular. , Consumer Cellular is the presenting sponsor of the consolation prizes.

Returning champions
The winner of each episode returns to compete against two new contestants on the next episode. Originally, a contestant who won five consecutive days retired undefeated and was guaranteed a spot in the Tournament of Champions. The five-day limit was eliminated September 8, 2003.

In rare instances, contestants tie for first place. The rules related to ties have changed over time. Since November 24, 2014, ties for first place following Final Jeopardy! are broken with a tie-breaker clue, resulting in only one champion being named, keeping their winnings, and returning to compete in the next show. The tied contestants are given the single clue, and the first contestant to buzz-in must give the correct question. A contestant cannot win by default if the opponent gives an incorrect question. The contestant must give a correct question to win the game. If neither player gives the correct question, another clue is given. Previously, if two or all three contestants tied for first place, they were declared "co-champions", and each retained his or her winnings and (unless one was a five-time champion who retired prior to 2003) returned on the following episode. A tie occurred on the January 29, 2014, episode when Arthur Chu, leading at the end of Double Jeopardy!, wagered to tie challenger Carolyn Collins rather than winning. Chu followed Jeopardy! College Champion Keith Williams's advice to wager for the tie to increase the leader's chances of winning. A three-way tie for first place has only occurred once on the syndicated version hosted by Trebek, on March 16, 2007, when Scott Weiss, Jamey Kirby, and Anders Martinson all ended the game with $16,000. Until March 1, 2018, no regular game had ended in a tie-breaker.

If no contestant finishes Final Jeopardy! with a positive total, there is no winner and three new contestants compete on the next episode. This has happened on several episodes, including the second episode hosted by Trebek.

A winner unable to return as champion because of a change in personal circumstancesfor example, illness or a job offermay be allowed to appear as a co-champion in a later episode.

Variations for tournament play
Throughout each season, Jeopardy! features various special tournaments for particular groups, including among others college students, teenagers, and teachers. Each year at the Tournament of Champions, the players who had won the most games and money in the previous season come back to compete against each other for a large cash prize. Tournaments generally feature 15 contestants and run for 10 consecutive episodes. They generally take place across three rounds: the quarterfinal round (five games), the semifinal round (three games), and the final round (two games).

The first five episodes, the quarterfinals, feature three new contestants each day. Other than in the Tournament of Champions, the quarterfinals are unseeded and contestants participate in a random draw to determine playing order and lectern positions over the course of the five games. The Tournament of Champions is seeded based on total winnings in regular games to determine playing order and lectern positions, with the top five players occupying the champion's lectern for the quarterfinal games. Since the removal of the five-game limit in regular gameplay, in the unlikely case of a tie in total winnings between two Tournament of Champions players, the player who won the most games receives the higher seed. If still tied, seeding is determined by comparing the tied players' aggregate Double Jeopardy! and (if still tied) Jeopardy! round scores.

The winners of the five quarterfinal games and the four highest-scoring non-winners ("wild cards") advance to the semifinals, which run for three days. The semifinals are seeded with the quarterfinal winners being seeded 1–5 based on their quarterfinal scores, and the wild cards being seeded 6–9. The winners of the quarterfinal games with the three highest scores occupy the champion's lectern for the semifinals. The winners of the three semifinal games advance to play in a two-game final match, in which the scores from both games are combined to determine the overall standings. This format has been used since the first Tournament of Champions in 1985 and was devised by Trebek himself.

To prevent later contestants from playing to beat the earlier wild card scores instead of playing to win, contestants are "completely isolated from the studio until it is their time to compete".

If none of the contestants in a quarterfinal end with a positive score, no contestant automatically qualifies from that game, and an additional wild card contestant advances instead. This occurred in the quarterfinals of the 1991 Seniors Tournament and the semifinals of the 2013 Teen Tournament, where the rule was in effect during the semifinals, but after that tournament the rule has changed for semifinals and finals.

As the players are not isolated during the semifinals the way they are during the quarterfinals, show management have since changed the rules in tournament semifinals. Starting with the 2013 Tournament of Champions, semifinal games, like the two-game finals, must have a winner. Players who participate in Final Jeopardy! will participate in the standard tie-breaker, regardless of the score being zero or a positive score. Similarly, if all three players have a zero score at the end of a two-game match, a normal tournament finals format will proceed to a tie-breaker. In a best-of-seven tournament format where a player must win three games to win the tournament, such as the 2020 Greatest of All Time or 2022 Tournament of Champions, the tie-breaker will be used regardless of the score being zero or positive for players to win the game and receive the point.

In the standard tournament finals format, contestants who finish Double Jeopardy! with a $0 or negative score on either day do not play Final Jeopardy! that day. Their score for that leg is recorded as $0.

Conception and development

In a 1963 Associated Press profile released shortly before the original Jeopardy! series premiered, Merv Griffin offered the following account of how he created the quiz show:

Griffin's first conception of the game used a board comprising ten categories with ten clues each, but after finding that this board could not easily be shown on camera, he reduced it to two rounds of thirty clues each, with five clues in each of six categories. He originally intended requiring grammatically correct phrasing (e.g., only accepting "Who is..." for a person), but after finding that grammatical correction slowed the game down, he decided to accept any correct response that was in question form. Griffin discarded his initial title of What's the Question? when skeptical network executive Ed Vane rejected his original concept of the game, claiming, "It doesn't have enough jeopardies."

The format of giving contestants the answers and requiring the questions had previously been used by the Gil Fates-hosted program CBS Television Quiz, which aired from July 1941 until May 1942.

Personnel

Hosts

Art Fleming was the original host of the show throughout both NBC runs and its brief weekly syndicated run, between 1964 and 1979. Alex Trebek served as host of the daily syndicated version from its premiere in 1984 until his death in 2020, except when he switched places with Wheel of Fortune host Pat Sajak as an April Fool's joke on April 1, 1997.

On a Fox News program in July 2018, Trebek said the odds of his retirement in 2020 were 50/50 "and a little less". He added that he might continue if he's "not making too many mistakes" but would make an "intelligent decision" as to when he should give up the emcee role. In November 2018, Trebek renewed his contract as host through 2022, stating in January 2019 that the work schedule consisting of 46 taping sessions each year was still manageable for a man of his age. On March 6, 2019, Trebek announced he had been diagnosed with stage IV pancreatic cancer (a disease from which Fleming also died on April 25, 1995). In a prepared video statement announcing his diagnosis, Trebek noted that his prognosis was poor but that he would aggressively fight the cancer in hopes of beating the odds and would continue hosting Jeopardy! for as long as he was able, joking that his contract obligated him to do so for three more years regardless of health.

Trebek was still serving as host when he died on November 8, 2020. His last episodes were taped on October 29, 2020. At the time, producers declined to discuss any plans to introduce his successor while stating that they had enough new episodes with Trebek as host to run through Christmas Day.

On November 9, 2020, the first episode after Trebek's death, executive producer Mike Richards paid tribute to Trebek, after a few seconds of silence where the lights on the Jeopardy! set slowly dimmed. That episode, as well as subsequent episodes that aired after Trebek's death, also included a dedication screen at the end of the credits through the remainder of the season.

To compensate for the delay caused by cancellation of most November production dates and pre-emptions caused by holiday week specials and sports, Sony announced on November 23, 2020, that the air dates of Trebek's final week were postponed, with episodes scheduled for the week of December 21–25 being postponed to January 4–8, 2021. Reruns of episodes in which Trebek recorded clues on location aired from December 21, 2020, to January 1, 2021, before his final episodes aired January 4–8, 2021.

Production resumed on November 30, 2020, with a planned group of guest hosts from the staff, with those episodes commencing January 11, 2021. Sony announced the hosts would come from "within the Jeopardy! family," with Ken Jennings announced as the first interim host. Between January and February 2021, additional guest hosts were announced, including executive producer Mike Richards; television news personalities Katie Couric, Bill Whitaker, Savannah Guthrie, Sanjay Gupta, and Anderson Cooper; athlete Aaron Rodgers; talk show host Mehmet Oz; and actress and neuroscientist Mayim Bialik. An April 2021 announcement listed the final group of guest hosts, including: television news personalities George Stephanopoulos and Robin Roberts; Reading Rainbow host LeVar Burton; Squawk on the Street co-host David Faber; and Fox Sports broadcaster Joe Buck. In addition, Buzzy Cohen, the 2017 Jeopardy! Tournament of Champions winner, hosted the 2021 Tournament of Champions.

On August 11, 2021, it was announced that Richards would succeed Trebek as host of the daily show and Bialik would host Jeopardy! primetime specials and spin-offs. On August 20, 2021, following a report from The Ringer exposing controversial remarks made on his podcast in the past, resurfaced controversies from Richards's time on The Price Is Right, and accusations of self-dealing regarding his executive producer position, Richards stepped down as host after taping the first week of episodes while remaining executive producer, before being dismissed from the latter role on August 31. Richards' five episodes as host aired in September 2021, then Bialik and Jennings alternated hosting the show for the rest of season 38, through the end of July 2022. Bialik also hosted the season's various tournaments and primetime specials. 

In July 2022, it was announced that Bialik and Jennings would continuing splitting hosting duties for the 39th season of the syndicated version. Jennings would also host the Tournament of Champions and the new Second Chance Tournament, while Bialik would also again host primetime specials and spinoffs, including a new celebrity edition of Jeopardy!, which premiered in September 2022. However, in January 2023, ABC announced Jennings would host a Jeopardy! Masters spinoff, indicating a change of arrangement.

Announcers
Don Pardo held the role of announcer on the NBC version and weekly syndicated version, while John Harlan replaced him for The All-New Jeopardy! In the daily syndicated version's first pilot, from 1983, Jay Stewart served as the announcer, but Johnny Gilbert took over the role at Trebek's recommendation when that version was picked up as a series.

Clue Crew
The Jeopardy! Clue Crew, introduced on September 24, 2001, was a team of roving correspondents who appeared in videos, recorded around the world, to narrate some clues. Explaining why the Clue Crew was added, executive producer Harry Friedman said, "TV is a visual medium, and the more visual we can make our clues, the more we think it will enhance the experience for the viewer."

Following the initial announcement of auditions for the team, over 5,000 people applied for Clue Crew posts. The original Clue Crew members were Cheryl Farrell, Jimmy McGuire, Sofia Lidskog, and Sarah Whitcomb Foss. Jon Cannon and Kelly Miyahara joined the Clue Crew in 2005. Farrell recorded clues until October 2008, and Cannon until July 2009. Miyahara, who also served as announcer for the Sports Jeopardy! spin-off series, left in 2019.

The Clue Crew was eliminated, beginning with the 39th season in September 2022; Foss became a producer for the show and McGuire a stage manager. Foss also serves as in-studio announcer when Johnny Gilbert is unable to attend a taping. In such cases, her voice is replaced with Gilbert's in post-production.

The Clue Crew traveled to over 300 cities worldwide, spanning all 50 of the United States and 46 other countries. Occasionally, they visited schools to showcase the educational game Classroom Jeopardy!

Production staff
 

Robert Rubin served as the producer of the original Jeopardy! series for most of its run and later became its executive producer. Following Rubin's promotion, the line producer was Lynette Williams.

Griffin was the daily syndicated version's executive producer until his retirement in 2000. Trebek served as producer as well as host until 1987, when he began hosting NBC's Classic Concentration for the next four years. At that time, he handed producer duties to George Vosburgh, who had formerly produced The All-New Jeopardy! In 1997, Harry Friedman, Lisa Finneran, and Rocky Schmidt succeeded Vosburgh as producers of the show. Beginning in 1999, Friedman became executive producer, and Gary Johnson became the third producer. In 2006, Deb Dittmann and Brett Schneider became producers, while Finneran, Schmidt, and Johnson became supervising producers.

The original Jeopardy! series was directed at different times by Bob Hultgren, Eleanor Tarshis, and Jeff Goldstein. Dick Schneider, who directed episodes of The All-New Jeopardy!, returned as director from 1984 to 1992. From 1992 to 2018, Kevin McCarthy served as director, who had previously served as associate director under Schneider. McCarthy announced his retirement after 26 years on June 26, 2018, and was succeeded as director by Clay Jacobsen.

As of 2012, Jeopardy! employs nine writers and five researchers to create and assemble the categories and clues. Billy Wisse is the editorial producer and Michele Loud is the editorial supervisor Previous writing and editorial supervisors have included Jules Minton, Terrence McDonnell, Harry Eisenberg, and Gary Johnson. Trebek himself also contributed to writing clues and categories.

Naomi Slodki is the production designer for the program. Previous art directors have included Henry Lickel, Dennis Roof, Bob Rang, and Ed Flesh (who also designed sets for other game shows such as The $25,000 Pyramid, Name That Tune, and Wheel of Fortune).

On August 1, 2019, Sony Pictures Television announced that Friedman would retire as executive producer of both Jeopardy! and Wheel of Fortune at the end of the 2019–20 season. On August 29, 2019, it was announced that Mike Richards replaced Friedman in 2020. On August 31, 2021, after Richards had resigned as permanent host earlier in the month, he was fired from his executive producer position at both Jeopardy! and Wheel, with Sony executives citing continued internal turmoil that Richards's resignation as host had failed to quell as they had hoped. Michael Davies from Embassy Row, which also produces Sony game show Who Wants to Be a Millionaire, was selected as interim executive producer through the 2021–22 season. On April 14, 2022, Davies accepted the role on a permanent basis.

Production
The daily syndicated version of Jeopardy! is produced by Sony Pictures Television (previously known as Columbia TriStar Television, the successor company to original producer Merv Griffin Enterprises). The copyright holder is Jeopardy Productions, which, like SPT, operates as a subsidiary of Sony Pictures Entertainment. The rights to distribute the program worldwide are owned by CBS Media Ventures, which absorbed original distributor King World Productions in 2007.

The original Jeopardy! series was taped in Studio 6A at NBC Studios at 30 Rockefeller Plaza in New York City, and The All-New Jeopardy! was taped in Studio 3 at NBC's Burbank Studios at 3000 West Alameda Avenue in Burbank, California. The Trebek version was initially taped at Metromedia Stage 7, KTTV, on Sunset Boulevard in Hollywood, but moved its production facilities to Hollywood Center Studios' Stage 1 in 1985. In 1994 the Jeopardy! production facilities moved to Sony Pictures Studios' Stage 10 on Washington Boulevard in Culver City, California, where production has remained since. Stage 10 was dedicated in Trebek's honor when episodes for the 38th season began taping in August 2021, with the stage being renamed to "The Alex Trebek Stage", with help from the Trebek family (Alex's wife, Jean, son, Matthew, and daughters, Emily and Nicky).

Five episodes are taped each day, with two days of taping every other week.

Set

Various technological and aesthetic changes have been made to the Jeopardy! set over the years. The original game board was exposed from behind a curtain and featured clues printed on cardboard pull cards which were revealed as contestants selected them. The All-New Jeopardy!s game board was exposed from behind double-slide panels and featured pull cards with the dollar amount in front and the clue behind it. When the Trebek version premiered in 1984, the game board used individual television monitors for each clue within categories. The original monitors were replaced with larger and sleeker ones in 1991. In 2006, these monitors were discarded in favor of a nearly seamless projection video wall, which was replaced in 2009 with 36 high-definition flat-panel monitors manufactured by Sony Electronics.

From 1985 to 1997, the sets were designed to have a background color of blue for the Jeopardy! round and red for the Double Jeopardy! and Final Jeopardy! rounds. In 1991 a brand new set was introduced that resembled a grid. On the episode aired November 11, 1996, Jeopardy! introduced the first of several sets designed by Naomi Slodki, who intended the set to resemble "the foyer of a very contemporary library, with wood and sandblasted glass and blue granite".

In 2002, another new set was introduced, which was given slight modifications when Jeopardy! and sister show Wheel of Fortune transitioned to high-definition broadcasting in 2006. During this time, virtual tours of the set began to be featured on the official web site. Both programs had been shot using HD cameras for several years before beginning to broadcast in HD. On standard-definition television broadcasts, episodes continue displaying with an aspect ratio of 4:3.

In 2009, Jeopardy! updated its set once again. The new set debuted with special episodes taped at the 42nd annual International CES technology trade show, hosted at the Las Vegas Convention Center in Winchester (Las Vegas Valley), Nevada, and became the primary set for Jeopardy! when the 2009–2010 season began.

In 2013, Jeopardy! introduced another new set. This set underwent several modifications in 2020, with a wider studio without any studio audience (the last episodes of the 2019–2020 season were also taped without an audience), and new lecterns for contestants and the host. The lecterns are spaced considerably apart to comply with California state regulations imposed when filming resumed after the coronavirus pandemic ended the 2020 season early. Although the modified COVID-era set from the previous two seasons was kept, the live studio audience fully returned for season 39, which began airing on September 12, 2022.

Theme music
Since the debut of Jeopardy! in 1964, several songs and arrangements have been used as the theme music, most of which were composed by Griffin. The main theme for the original Jeopardy! series was "Take Ten", composed by Griffin's wife Julann. The All-New Jeopardy! opened with "January, February, March" and closed with "Frisco Disco", both of which were composed by Griffin himself.

The best-known theme song on Jeopardy! is "Think!", originally composed by Griffin under the title "A Time for Tony", as a lullaby for his son. "Think!" has always been used for the 30-second period in Final Jeopardy! when the contestants write down their responses, and since the syndicated version debuted in 1984, a rendition of that tune has been used as the main theme song. "Think!" has become so popular that it has been used in many different contexts, from sporting events to weddings; "its 30-second countdown has become synonymous with any deadline pressure". Griffin estimated that the use of "Think!" had earned him royalties of over $70 million throughout his lifetime. "Think!" led Griffin to win the Broadcast Music, Inc. (BMI) President's Award in 2003, and during GSN's 2009 Game Show Awards special, it was named "Best Game Show Theme Song". In 1997, the main theme (later rearranged in 2001) and Final Jeopardy! "Think!" cue were rearranged by Steve Kaplan, who served as music director until his December 2003 death. Then in 2008, the Jeopardy! music package was rearranged again, this time by Chris Bell Music & Sound Design. The newest version of the main theme, which draws elements from the 2008 arrangement, was composed by Bleeding Fingers Music and has been used since season 38.

Audition process

For the original Jeopardy! series, prospective contestants contacted the production office in New York to arrange an appointment and to preliminarily determine eligibility. They were briefed and auditioned together in groups of ten to thirty individuals, participating in both a written test and mock games. Individuals who were successful at the audition were invited to appear on the program within approximately six weeks.

Since 1984, prospective contestants begin with a written exam comprising 50 questions. This exam is administered online periodically, as well as being offered at regional contestant search events. Since 1998, a Winnebago recreational vehicle dubbed the "Jeopardy! Brain Bus" travels to conduct regional events throughout the United States and Canada. Participants who correctly answer at least 35 out of 50 questions advance in the audition process and are invited to attend in-person group auditions throughout the country. At these auditions, a second written exam is administered, followed by a mock game and interviews. Those who are approved are notified at a later time and invited to appear as contestants. Eligibility is limited to people who have not previously appeared as contestants, and have not been to an in-person audition for at least 18 months.

Many of the contestants who appear on the series, including a majority of Teen Tournament contestants and nearly half of all College Tournament contestants, participated in quiz bowl competitions during their time in high school. The National Academic Quiz Tournaments has been described by Ken Jennings as a de facto "minor league" for game shows such as Jeopardy!

Broadcast history

The original Jeopardy! series premiered on NBC on March 30, 1964, and by the end of the 1960s was the second-highest-rated daytime game show, behind only The Hollywood Squares. The program was successful until 1974, when Lin Bolen, then NBC's Vice President of Daytime Programming, moved the show out of the noontime slot where it had been located for most of its run, as part of her effort to boost ratings among the 18–34 female demographic. After 2,753 episodes, the original Jeopardy! series ended on January 3, 1975. To compensate Griffin for its cancellation, NBC purchased Wheel of Fortune, another show that he had created, and premiered it the following Monday. A syndicated edition of Jeopardy!, distributed by Metromedia and featuring many contestants who were previously champions on the original series, aired in primetime from 1974 to 1975. The NBC daytime series was later revived as The All-New Jeopardy!, which premiered on October 2, 1978, and aired 108 episodes, ending on March 2, 1979. This revival featured significant rule changes, including progressive elimination of contestants over the course of the main game, and a Super Jeopardy! bonus round (based loosely on bingo) instead of Final Jeopardy!

The daily syndicated version debuted on September 10, 1984, and was launched in response to the success of the syndicated version of Wheel and the installation of electronic trivia games in pubs and bars. This version of the program has outlived 300 other game shows and has become the second most popular game show in syndication (behind Wheel), averaging 25 million viewers per week. The most recent renewal, in January 2023, extends it through the 2027–28 season.

Jeopardy! has spawned versions in many foreign countries throughout the world, including Canada, the United Kingdom, Germany, Sweden, Russia, Denmark, Israel, and Australia. The American syndicated version of Jeopardy! is also broadcast throughout the world, with international distribution rights handled by CBS Studios International.

Three spin-off versions of Jeopardy! have been created. Rock & Roll Jeopardy! debuted on VH1 in 1998 and ran until 2001. The format centered around post-1950s popular music trivia and was hosted by Jeff Probst. Jep!, which aired on GSN during the 1998–1999 season, was a special children's version hosted by Bob Bergen and featured various rule changes from the original version. Sports Jeopardy!, a sports-themed version hosted by Dan Patrick, premiered in 2014 on the Crackle digital service and eventually moved to the cable sports network NBCSN in 2016.

In March 2020, taping halted as a result of the COVID-19 pandemic. Originally, the production team taped episodes without an audience, until production was shut down altogether. In May 2020, Sony announced new episodes would air until June 12, 2020, including the Teacher's Tournament. In July 2020, Jeopardy! began rerunning a package of 20 classic episodes, including the first two from the syndicated run.

Production resumed in August 2020 with new safety measures in place following government guidelines to protect contestants, staff, crew and talent. New expanded lecterns, designed to allow social distancing during gameplay, are spaced apart from one another. Until the COVID-19 pandemic in the United States is over, only essential staff and crew are allowed on stage. Personal protective equipment is provided for everyone behind the scenes and all staff and crew are tested regularly, while contestants are also tested before they step onto the set. Social distancing measures are also enforced off-stage. Ken Jennings joined production in an on-air role in 2020.

Following Trebek's death, an announcement noted that the pre-taped episodes were to air posthumously until December 25, 2020. Owing to concerns after a late start to tapings caused by the pandemic and the cancellation of November tapings, officials added a two-week lineup of classic episodes to avoid NFL, NBA, or local Christmas programming preemptions that moved Trebek's final episode to January 8, 2021. The first episode with an interim host aired January 11, 2021.

Archived episodes
Only a small number of episodes of the first three Jeopardy! versions survive. From the original NBC daytime version, archived episodes mostly consist of black-and-white kinescopes of the original color videotapes. Various episodes from 1967, 1971, 1973, and 1974 are listed among the holdings of the UCLA Film and Television Archive. The 1964 "test episode", Episode No. 2,000 (from February 21, 1972, in color), and a June 1975 episode of the weekly syndicated edition exist at the Paley Center for Media. The test episode, of which only a few limited clips had been released, was released to the public in full on the Jeopardy! YouTube account March 30, 2022, and an audiotape containing approximately five minutes (including introductions and Final Jeopardy!) from the first aired episode was also released to the public; both episodes were released to celebrate the 58th anniversary of the show's debut. The 1975 series finale, also in color and containing two short clips from the 1967 "College Scholarship Tournament" and Gene Shalit's appearance on an early version of Celebrity Jeopardy! also exists in its entirety. Incomplete paper records of the NBC-era games exist on microfilm at the Library of Congress. GSN holds The All-New Jeopardy!s premiere and finale in broadcast quality, and aired the latter on December 31, 1999, as part of its "Y2Play" marathon. The UCLA Archive holds a copy of a pilot taped for CBS in 1977, and the premiere exists among the Paley Center's holdings.

GSN, which, like Jeopardy!, is an affiliate of Sony Pictures Television, has rerun episodes since the channel's launch in 1994. Copies of 43 Trebek-hosted syndicated Jeopardy! episodes aired between 1989 and 2004 have been collected by the UCLA Archive, and the premiere and various other episodes are included in the Paley Center's collection. In July 2022, Vulture reported that vintage episodes of the daily syndicated version would air on a dedicated channel on Pluto TV beginning in August. The channel, named Jeopardy! Hosted by Alex Trebek, launched on August 1.

Reception and legacy

By 1994, the press called Jeopardy! "an American icon". It has won a record 39 Daytime Emmy Awards. The program holds the record for the Daytime Emmy Award for Outstanding Game/Audience Participation Show, with seventeen awards won in that category. Trebek won seven awards for Outstanding Game Show Host. Twelve other awards were won by the show's directors and writers in the categories of Outstanding Direction for a Game/Audience Participation Show and Outstanding Special Class Writing before these categories were removed in 2006. On June 17, 2011, Trebek shared the Lifetime Achievement Award with Sajak at the 38th Annual Daytime Emmy Awards ceremony. The following year, the program was honored with a Peabody Award for its role in encouraging, celebrating, and rewarding knowledge.

In its April 17–23, 1993, issue, TV Guide named Jeopardy! the best game show of the 1970s as part of a celebration of the magazine's 40th anniversary. In January 2001, the magazine ranked the program number 2 on its "50 Greatest Game Shows" list—second only to The Price Is Right. It later ranked Jeopardy! number 45 on its list of the 60 Best TV Series of All Time, calling it "habit-forming" and saying that the program "always makes [its viewers] feel smarter". Also in 2013, the program ranked number 1 on TV Guides list of the 60 Greatest Game Shows. In the summer of 2006, the program was ranked number 2 on GSN's list of the 50 Greatest Game Shows of All Time, second only to Match Game.

A hall of fame honoring Jeopardy! was added to the Sony Pictures Studios tour on September 20, 2011. It features the show's Emmy Awards as well as retired set pieces, classic merchandise, video clips, photographs, and other memorabilia related to Jeopardy!s history.

In 1989, Fleming expressed dissatisfaction with the daily syndicated Jeopardy! series in an essay published in Sports Illustrated. He confessed that he only watched the Trebek version infrequently—only for a handful of questions—and criticized this iteration mainly for its Hollywood setting. Fleming believed that in contrast to New Yorkers who Fleming considered being more intelligent and authentic, moving the show to Hollywood brought both an unrealistic glamour and a dumbing-down of the program that he disdained. He also disliked the decision to not award losing contestants their cash earnings (believing the parting gifts offered instead were cheap) and expressed surprise that what he considered a parlor game had transformed into such a national phenomenon under Trebek. In television interviews, Fleming expressed similar sentiments while also noting that he approved of Trebek's approach to hosting, that Fleming and Trebek were personal friends and that, despite the modern show's flaws, it was still one of the best television shows.

Jeopardy!s answer-and-question format has become widely entrenched: Fleming observed that other game shows had contestants phrasing their answers in question form, leading hosts to remind them that they are not competing on Jeopardy!

Tournaments and other events

Regular events
Starting in 1985, the show has held an annual Tournament of Champions featuring the top fifteen champions who have appeared on the show since the last tournament. The top prize awarded to the winner was originally valued at $100,000, and increased to $250,000 in 2003. Other regular tournaments include the Teen Tournament, with a $100,000 top prize; the College Championship, in which undergraduate students from American colleges and universities compete for a $100,000 top prize; and the Teachers Tournament, where educators compete for a $100,000 top prize. Each tournament runs for ten consecutive episodes in a format devised by Trebek himself, consisting of five quarter-final games, three semi-finals, and a final consisting of two games with the scores totaled. Winners of the College Championship and Teachers Tournament are invited to participate in the Tournament of Champions.

Non-tournament events held regularly on the show include Celebrity Jeopardy!, in which celebrities and other notable individuals compete for charitable organizations of their choice, and Kids Week, a special competition for school-age children aged 10 through 12.

Special events

Three International Tournaments, held in 1996, 1997, and 2001, featured one-week competitions among champions from each of the international versions of Jeopardy! Each of the countries that aired their own version of the show in those years could nominate a contestant. The format was identical to the semi-finals and finals of other Jeopardy! tournaments. In 1996 and 1997, the winner received $25,000. In 2001, the top prize was doubled to $50,000. The 1997 tournament was recorded in Stockholm on the set of the Swedish version of Jeopardy!, and is significant for being the first week of Jeopardy! episodes taped in a foreign country. Magnus Härenstam, the host of the Swedish version of Jeopardy! at the time, introduced the first episode of the 1997 tournament, including Trebek. In addition, prior to Final Jeopardy! each day, a video clip of Härenstam with Trebek in Stockholm was shown.

There have been several special tournaments featuring the greatest contestants in Jeopardy! history. The first of these "all-time best" tournaments, Super Jeopardy!, aired in the summer of 1990 on ABC, and featured 35 top contestants from the previous seasons of the Trebek version and one notable champion from the original Jeopardy! series competing for a top prize of $250,000. In 1993, that year's Tournament of Champions was followed by a Tenth Anniversary Tournament conducted over five episodes. In May 2002, to commemorate the Trebek version's 4,000th episode, the show invited fifteen champions to play for a $1 million prize in the Million Dollar Masters tournament, which took place at Radio City Music Hall in New York City. The Ultimate Tournament of Champions aired in 2005 and pitted 145 former Jeopardy! champions against each other, with two winners moving on to face Ken Jennings in a three-game final for $2,000,000, the largest prize in the show's history. Overall, the tournament spanned 15 weeks and 76 episodes, starting on February 9 and ending on May 25. In 2014, Jeopardy! commemorated the 30th anniversary of the Trebek version with a Battle of the Decades tournament, in which 15 champions apiece from the first, second, and third decades of Jeopardy!s daily syndicated history competed for a grand prize of $1,000,000. On November 18, 2019, an announcement of Jeopardy! returning to ABC for a primetime "Greatest of All Time" tournament was made beginning January 7, 2020, which was to include Ken Jennings, Brad Rutter, and James Holzhauer. The event used a multi-night format, with each episode featuring a two-game match. The contestant with the higher cumulative point total across both games was declared the winner of the match. The first to win three matches received a $1,000,000 prize. The tournament concluded on January 14, 2020, after four matches, with Ken Jennings winning three matches to Holzhauer's one and Rutter's zero wins. Rutter and Holzhauer each received $250,000 for their participation.

In November 1998, Jeopardy! traveled to Boston to reassemble 12 past Teen Tournament contestants for a special Teen Reunion Tournament. In 2008, fifteen contestants from the first two Kids Weeks competed in a special reunion tournament. During 2009–2010, a special edition of Celebrity Jeopardy!, called the Million Dollar Celebrity Invitational, was played in which twenty-seven contestants from past celebrity episodes competed for a grand prize of $1,000,000 for charity. The grand prize was won by Michael McKean.

The IBM Challenge aired February 14–16, 2011, and featured IBM's Watson computer facing off against Ken Jennings and Brad Rutter in a two-game match played over three shows. This was the first man-vs.-machine competition in Jeopardy!s history. Watson won both the first game and the overall match to win the grand prize of $1 million, which IBM divided between two charities (World Vision International and World Community Grid). Jennings, who won $300,000 for second place, and Rutter, who won the $200,000 third-place prize, both pledged to donate half of their winnings to charity. The competition brought the show its highest ratings since the Ultimate Tournament of Champions.

In 2019, The All-Star Games had six teams with three former champions each. Each team member played one of the three rounds in each game played. Rutter, David Madden and Larissa Kelly won the tournament.

Record holders
Jeopardy!s record for the longest winning streak is held by Ken Jennings, who competed on the show from June 2 through November 30, 2004, winning 74 matches before being defeated by Nancy Zerg in his 75th appearance. He amassed $2,522,700 over his 75 episodes, for an average of $33,636 per episode. At the time, he held the record as the highest money-winner ever on American game shows, and his winning streak increased the show's ratings and popularity to the point where it became TV's highest-rated syndicated program. In addition to these winnings on the daily Jeopardy! series, Jennings returned for a number of Jeopardy! special tournaments, taking home the following: the second-place prize of $500,000 in the 2005 Jeopardy! Ultimate Tournament of Champions, the $300,000-second-place prize in the 2011 Jeopardy! IBM Challenge, the $123,600-second-place prize in the 2014 Jeopardy! Battle of the Decades, a $100,000 prize (one-third of the $300,000-second-place prize to his three-player team) in the 2019 Jeopardy! All-Star Games, and the $1,000,000 first-place prize in the 2020 Jeopardy! The Greatest of All Time tournament.

The record holder for lifetime Jeopardy!-related winnings is Brad Rutter, who has won nearly $5.2 million in cash and prizes across five episodes of the regular series (when the rules stipulated that a contestant who won five consecutive days retired undefeated) and seven Jeopardy! tournaments and events (winning five of those specials, along with two third-place finishes). Counting all prizes that he won, he has achieved a cumulative total of $5,129,036 in winnings, which included: the $55,102 prize over five regular episodes in 2000 (also including the value of two cars won, worth $45,000), the $100,000 first-place prize in the 2001 Jeopardy! Tournament of Champions, the $1,000,000 first-place prize in the 2002 Jeopardy! Million Dollar Masters Tournament, the $2,000,000 first-place prize (plus $115,000 in preliminary rounds) in the 2005 Jeopardy! Ultimate Tournament of Champions, the $200,000 third-place prize in the 2011 Jeopardy! IBM Challenge, the $1,030,600 first-place prize in the 2014 Jeopardy! Battle of the Decades, $333,334 (one-third of the $1,000,000 first-place prize, shared with his three-player team) in the 2019 Jeopardy! All-Star Games and a $250,000 prize in the 2020 Jeopardy! The Greatest of All Time tournament.

The holder of the all-time record for single-day winnings on Jeopardy! is James Holzhauer. Holzhauer first surpassed the record of $77,000, held since 2010 by Roger Craig, when he earned $110,914 on the episode that aired on April 9, 2019. Holzhauer pushed his own single-day record to $131,127 on the episode that aired April 17, 2019, by amassing $71,114 over the episode's first two rounds, then successfully wagering an additional $60,013 in the Final Jeopardy! round. Holzhauer's total of 32 consecutive games won was second place of all time in regular game play at the time and remains fourth overall after Matt Amodio and Amy Schneider surpassed Holzhauer in 2021 and 2022, respectively. When he departed the show, he held the top 16 spots for highest single-day regular-game winnings and is the only player to win more than $100,000 in a single episode in regular play (achieved six times). On April 15, 2019, Holzhauer moved into second place for regular play Jeopardy! winnings (behind Jennings) and third place for all Jeopardy!-related winnings (behind Rutter and Jennings). On April 23, 2019, Holzhauer joined Rutter and Jennings as the third Jeopardy!-made millionaire (Amodio eventually became the fourth). The next day, Holzhauer moved onto the top ten list for all-time American game show winnings at No. 10, joining Rutter (#1) and Jennings (#2) on that list. Holzhauer was defeated on the June 3, 2019, episode, finishing in second place. His winnings on Jeopardy! totaled $2,464,216, $58,484 behind Jennings' record. Including over $58,000 from a 2014 appearance on The Chase, with Holzhauer's $2.96 million from Jeopardy! (including his Tournament of Champions and The Greatest of All Time prizes), he is #3 on the list of all-time American game show winnings.

The record-holder among women on Jeopardy! for regular series winnings is Amy Schneider, with a total of $1,382,800 earned in 40 episodes between 2021 and 2022. Schneider is currently ranked second all-time in consecutive games won, behind only Jennings (74). Mattea Roach, whose winning streak earned $560,983 over 23 games in April and May 2022, has been the most successful Canadian contestant to have competed on the program. Following her run, Roach ranked fifth for both consecutive games won and regular play Jeopardy! winnings.

The highest single-day winnings in a Celebrity Jeopardy! tournament was achieved by comedian Andy Richter during a first-round game of the 2009–2010 "Million Dollar Celebrity Invitational", in which he finished with $68,000 for his selected charity, the St. Jude Children's Research Hospital.

Four contestants on the Trebek version share the record for winning a game with the lowest amount possible, at $1. The first was U.S. Air Force Lieutenant Colonel Darryl Scott, on the episode that aired January 19, 1993. The second was Benjamin Salisbury, on a Celebrity Jeopardy! episode that aired April 30, 1997. The third was Brandi Chastain, on the Celebrity Jeopardy! episode that aired February 9, 2001. The fourth was U.S. Navy Lieutenant Manny Abell, on the episode that aired October 17, 2017.

Other media

Portrayals and parodies
Jeopardy! has been featured in several films, television shows, and books over the years, mostly with one or more characters participating as contestants, or viewing and interacting with the game show from their own homes. The sitcoms The Golden Girls, Mama's Family, and Cheers are among the shows which have featured primary characters participating in a fictionalized version of the show (the latter in the episode "What Is... Cliff Clavin?"). The animated television shows Family Guy, The Simpsons, and Scooby-Doo and Guess Who? have done likewise, all three times with Trebek providing his own voice. On the series The Conners, Jackie Harris plays on a fictionalized version of the show during the guest host run of Aaron Rodgers.

From 1996 to 2015, Saturday Night Live featured a recurring Celebrity Jeopardy! sketch in which Trebek, portrayed by Will Ferrell, has to deal with the exasperating ineptitude of the show's celebrity guests and the constant taunts of antagonists Sean Connery (played by Darrell Hammond) and Burt Reynolds (Norm Macdonald). The show has also parodied Jeopardy! by way of the recurring sketch Black Jeopardy!, in which the host and two of the three contestants are stereotypical black Americans and the categories and clues likewise reflect black American culture. The third contestant in Black Jeopardy! provides a contrast to the others.

The 1992 film White Men Can't Jump features a subplot in which Gloria Clemente (played by Rosie Perez) attempts to pass the show's auditions. In the David Foster Wallace short story "Little Expressionless Animals", first published in The Paris Review and later reprinted in Wallace's collection Girl with Curious Hair, the character Julie Smith competes and wins on every Jeopardy! game for three years (a total of 700 episodes) and then uses her winnings to pay for the care of her brother, who has autism. American musician "Weird Al" Yankovic satirized the Art Fleming incarnation of the show with his 1984 single "I Lost on Jeopardy", a parody of Greg Kihn's 1983 hit song "Jeopardy". Released months before the Trebek version of the show, the song's accompanying music video featured a re-creation of the 1960s-era set, along with cameos from Fleming, Pardo and, at the end of the video, Kihn himself.

At the DEF CON hacker conference in Las Vegas, a variant called 'Hacker Jeopardy' has been organized. In 2004, it was won by Kevin Mitnick.

Merchandise

Over the years, the Jeopardy! brand has been licensed for various products. From 1964 through 1976, with one release in 1982, Milton Bradley issued annual board games based on the original Fleming version. The Trebek version has been adapted into board games released by Pressman Toy Corporation, Tyco Toys, and Parker Brothers. In addition, Jeopardy! has been adapted into a number of video games released on various consoles and handhelds spanning multiple hardware generations, starting with a Nintendo Entertainment System game released in 1987. The show has also been adapted for personal computers (starting in 1987 with Apple II, Commodore 64, and DOS versions), Facebook, Twitter, Android, and the Roku Channel Store.

A DVD titled Jeopardy!: An Inside Look at America's Favorite Quiz Show, released by Sony Pictures Home Entertainment on November 8, 2005, features five curated episodes of the Trebek version (the 1984 premiere, Jennings' final game, and the three-game finals of the Ultimate Tournament of Champions) and three featurettes discussing the show's history and question selection process. Other products featuring the Jeopardy! brand include a collectible watch, a series of daily desktop calendars, and various slot machine games for casinos and the Internet.

Internet
Jeopardy!s official website, active as early as 1998, receives over 400,000 monthly visitors. The website features videos, photographs, and other information related to each week's contestants, as well as mini-sites promoting remote tapings and special tournaments. The Jeopardy! website is regularly updated to align with producers' priorities for the show. In its 2012 "Readers Choice Awards", About.com praised the official Jeopardy! website for featuring "everything [visitors] need to know about the show, as well as some fun interactive elements", and for having a humorous error page.

In November 2009, Jeopardy! launched a viewer loyalty program called the "Jeopardy! Premier Club", which allowed home viewers to identify Final Jeopardy! categories from episodes for a chance to earn points, and play a weekly Jeopardy! game featuring categories and clues from the previous week's episodes. Every three months, contestants were selected randomly to advance to one of three quarterly online tournaments; after these tournaments were played, the three highest-scoring contestants would play one final online tournament for the chance to win $5,000 and a trip to Los Angeles to attend a taping of Jeopardy! The Premier Club was discontinued by July 2011.

See also 
 List of notable Jeopardy! contestants
 Strategies and skills of Jeopardy! champions

Notes

References
Citations

Bibliography

 
 
 
 
 
 
 
 
 
 
 
 
 
 
 
 
 
 
 
 

Further reading

External links

 
 
 
 
 
 J! Archive, fan-maintained Jeopardy! archive site

 
1960s American game shows
1964 American television series debuts
1970s American game shows
1975 American television series endings
1978 American television series debuts
1979 American television series endings
1980s American game shows
1984 American television series debuts
1990s American game shows
2000s American game shows
2010s American game shows
2020s American game shows
American television series revived after cancellation
Culver City, California
Daytime Emmy Award for Outstanding Game Show winners
English-language television shows
First-run syndicated television programs in the United States
Mobile games
NBC original programming
Peabody Award-winning television programs
Sony mobile games
Television series by CBS Studios
Television series by Merv Griffin Enterprises
Television series by Sony Pictures Television
Television series created by Merv Griffin
Television series by King World Productions
Television shows adapted into video games
Television productions suspended due to the COVID-19 pandemic